Lyzanxia is a French metal group that combine thrash metal with elements of death metal.

Biography
Lyzanxia were formed in 1996 by the Potvin brothers. They quickly recorded their first demo, RIP My Skin, it displayed the band's potential. In 1997 the band produced an 11-song demo entitled Lullaby that introduced them to the press and underground scene. They then started to play with groups such as Edge of Sanity, Disfear, Loudblast and No Return.

For their first album: Eden, they recruited one of the better known producers in European metal: Fredrik Nordström. The album was released in 2000 to critical acclaim and good reviews (6/6 Hard Rock: France, 84/100 Burrn!: Japan). Two videos were released to promote the album: "Bewitched" and "Dream Feeder".

In 2002 Lyzanxia recorded their second album, Mindcrimes. The group worked again with Nordström and the Potvin brothers travelled to Gothenburg, Sweden to mix the songs with Nordström and master the album with Goran Finnberg. To support the album, Lyzanxia released two videos, "Silence Code" and "Medulla Need". They toured with Shaman and Behemoth to promote the album.

In 2006 Lyzanxia signed with Listenable Records. They recorded and released their album Unsu. The band once again worked with Nordström (who once again mixed the album) and recently toured with Exit Ten and Soilwork to promote it.

Members
Current members
Franck Potvin - guitars and vocals
David Potvin - guitars and vocals
Perdicaro Wines - bass
Clément Rouxel - drums

Session musicians/former members
Gaël Feret - Drums
Close Eguil - Bass
Gweltaz Kerjan - Drums
Dirk Verbeuren - Drums
Clément Decrock - drums

Discography
1996: RIP My Skin (demo)
1997: Lullaby (demo)
2000: Eden
2003: Mindcrimes
2006: Unsu
2010: Locust

References

External links
 
 Official MySpace

French thrash metal musical groups
Musical quartets
Musical groups established in 1996
1996 establishments in France
Musical groups from Angers